Nekpur Sabitnagar is a village in the Ghaziabad District of Uttar Pradesh in India.

It is a major flower cultivation area. It is the tenth most populated village in Ghaziabad. The population density is 770 people/km2.

The village has a post office with the PIN code of 201206.

As of 2011, the village had a total of 6,404 residents. Males and females were 3,386 and 3,018 respectively. The percentage from the general caste was 96% and from the schedule caste was 4%. Children made up 19% of the population with 55% boys and 45% girls. There were on average 6 people per family with a total of 1,008 families.

References 

Villages in Ghaziabad district, India